Club Deportivo Cobeja was a football team based in Cobeja in the autonomous community of Castilla-La Mancha.

History
CD Cobeja was founded in 1980. The club was dissolved before the 2010–11 season.

Season to season

1 seasons in Tercera División

References

Divisiones Regionales de Fútbol clubs
Association football clubs established in 1980
Association football clubs disestablished in 2010
Defunct football clubs in Castilla–La Mancha
1980 establishments in Spain
2010 disestablishments in Spain